Union Sportive d'Ivry are a French multi-sports club based in Ivry-sur-Seine, Val-de-Marne. The club is primarily known for its football team and handball team. US Ivry play their home matches at the Stade Clerville, which seats 2,000 spectators.

History
The club was founded in 1919 by Socialist Youth activists in the name of Union Sportive du Travail d'Ivry (USTI). The club's first chairman was Gaston Richard. Early in the club's foundation, they primarily focused on the football, athletics, and basketball sections of the club. As the club grew in size, so did the membership and the club eventually developed new sporting sections such as cycling, gymnastics, boxing, and tennis. In 1934, the club merged with two local clubs to form a new club called Etoile Sportive du Travail d'Ivry.

After the second World War, in 1949, the club changed its name to its current form Union Sportive d'Ivry. Three years later, the club's stadium, Stade Clerville, was built. In 2006, the club had 36 sections of sport with over 6,000 members.

Honours
Coupe de Paris: 1995, 2008
Coupe de Val-de-Marne: 1995, 2008
Promotion d'Honneur Champion: 1992
Division d'Honneur Regionale Champion: 1995
Division d'Honneur Champion: 1998

Players

Current squad

See also
US d'Ivry Handball

References

Association football clubs established in 1919
Multi-sport clubs in France
1919 establishments in France
Ivry
Ivry